The Mayor of the City of Split, colloquially the Poteštat (derived from "podestà"), is the highest official of the Croatian city of Split. From 1990 to 2007 the mayor was elected by the city assembly. Since 2007 Croatian mayors are elected directly by the citizens. The first such election in Split occurred in 2009.

List 
Here follows a list of the 72 men who have thus far served as Mayor (or President of the City Council) of the City of Split. They were immediately preceded by the succession of podestà (city "princes" or "governors", kneževi) under the Venetian Republic. The latter were colloquially known as "poteštati", and usually also held the office of Captain of the City. The term "poteštat" has since remained as a local, traditional term for the mayor as well.

Kingdom of Italy

French Empire

Austria

Kingdom of Yugoslavia

World War II

Federal Yugoslavia

Since independence 
 (4)
 (2)
 (1)
 (1)

 (1)
 (1)

See also 
 Split
 Dalmatia
 Split-Dalmatia County
 Elections in Croatia

References 

Split
Split, Croatia